A partial solar eclipse occurred on June 30, 1935. A solar eclipse occurs when the Moon passes between Earth and the Sun, thereby totally or partly obscuring the image of the Sun for a viewer on Earth. A partial solar eclipse occurs in the polar regions of the Earth when the center of the Moon's shadow misses the Earth.

Related eclipses

Solar eclipses 1935–1938

Metonic series

References

External links 
 http://eclipse.gsfc.nasa.gov/SEplot/SEplot1901/SE1935Jun30P.GIF

1935 06 30
1935 in science
1935 06 30
June 1935 events